= Volume projections =

Technique used to forecast sales

Volume projections enable marketers to forecast sales by sampling customer intentions through surveys and market studies. By estimating how many customers will try a new product, and how often they will make repeat purchases, marketers can establish the basis for such projections. Projections from customer surveys are especially useful in the early stages of product development and in setting the timing for product launch. Through such projections, customer response can be estimated without the expense of a full product launch. In a survey of nearly 200 senior marketing managers, 56 percent responded that they found volume projections very useful.

== Purpose ==
When projecting sales for relatively new products, marketers typically use a system of trial and repeat calculations to anticipate sales in future periods. This works on the principle that everyone buying the product will either be a new customer (a 'trier') or a repeat customer. By adding new and repeat customers in any period, we can establish the penetration of a product in the marketplace. It is challenging, however, to project sales to a large population on the basis of simulated test markets, or even full-fledged regional rollouts. Marketers have developed various solutions to increase the speed and reduce the cost of test marketing, such as stocking a store with products (or mock-ups of new products) or giving customers money to buy the products of their choice. These simulate real shopping conditions but require specific models to estimate full-market volume on the basis of test results.

== Construction ==
Volume projections combine trial volume and repeat volume, that is:

Total volume (#) = Trial volume (#) + Repeat volume (#)
